Friend Zone 2: Dangerous Area is a 2020 Thai television series starring Nichaphat Chatchaipholrat (Pearwah), Tipnaree Weerawatnodom (Namtan), Thanat Lowkhunsombat (Lee), Prachaya Ruangroj (Singto), Nat Sakdatorn, Pronpiphat Pattanasettanon (Plustor), Weerayut Chansook (Arm), Nathasit Kotimanuswanich (Best), Way-Ar Sangngern (Joss), Sarunchana Apisamaimongkol (Aye) and Purim Rattanaruangwattana (Pluem) which serves as the sequel of Friend Zone.

Directed by Tidakorn Pookaothong and produced by GMMTV together with Trasher Bangkok, it is one of the twelve television series for 2020 showcased by GMMTV during their "New & Next" event on 15 October 2019. The series premiered on GMM 25 and LINE TV on 25 September 2020, airing on Fridays at 22:10 ICT and 23:10 ICT, respectively.

Cast and characters 
Below are the cast of the series:

Main 
 Nichaphat Chatchaipholrat (Pearwah) as Boyo
 Tipnaree Weerawatnodom (Namtan) as Boom
 Thanat Lowkhunsombat (Lee) as Good
 Prachaya Ruangroj (Singto) as Earth
 Nat Sakdatorn as Dr. Sam
 Pronpiphat Pattanasettanon (Plustor) as Stud
 Weerayut Chansook (Arm) as Pop
 Nathasit Kotimanuswanich (Best) as Tor
 Way-Ar Sangngern (Joss) as Safe
 Sarunchana Apisamaimongkol (Aye) as Amm
 Purim Rattanaruangwattana (Pluem) as Locker

Supporting 
 Chayapol Jutamas (AJ) as Ta
 Lapisara Intarasut (Apple) as Cris
 Ravisrarat Pibulpanuvat (Preen) as Bew
 Phatchara Tubthong (Kapook) as Music
 Unnop Thongborisut (Por) as Dr. Ton
 Chanokwanun Rakcheep as Stud's Mother
 Thanavate Siriwattanakul (Gap) as Tod
 Pusit Disthapisit (Fluke) as Blue

References

External links 
 Friend Zone 2: Dangerous Area on GMM 25 website 
 Friend Zone 2: Dangerous Area  on LINE TV
 GMMTV

Television series by GMMTV
2020 Thai television series debuts
GMM 25 original programming
Thai romantic drama television series
Television series by Trasher Bangkok